The following is a list of awards and nominations received by Rosie Perez, an American actress known for her roles on the stage and screen.

Perez became known for her breakout film role as Tina in Spike Lee's critically acclaimed drama film Do the Right Thing (1989). She also starred in drama White Men Can't Jump (1992) for which she received two nominations from the Chicago Film Critics Association. In 1993, she has received an Academy Award for Best Supporting Actress nomination for her performance in the Peter Weir directed American drama film Fearless. In 2007 she received a Independent Spirit Award for Best Supporting Female nomination for her performance in the crime drama The Take. For her work in television she received three Primetime Emmy Award for Outstanding Choreography nominations for her work on the sketch comedy series In Living Color. She also appeared in Lipstick Jungle (2009-09), Law and Order: Special Victims Unit (2009), Nurse Jackie (2012), Search Party (2016), and She's Gotta Have It (2019). She also appeared in the HBO drama series The Flight Attendant (2020) for which she was nominated for the Screen Actors Guild Award for Outstanding Performance by an Ensemble in a Comedy Series.

Major associations

Academy Awards

Emmy Awards

Golden Globe Awards

Screen Actors Guild Awards

Independent Spirit Awards

Miscellaneous awards

References 

Perez, Rosie